According to the Book of Mormon, the land of Jershon was located on the east by the sea, south of the land Bountiful.

We first hear of Jershon in the book when the people of Ammon, seeking protection from their fellow Lamanites, resettle there about 76 BC. Because of the threat of war from the Zoramites in Antionum to the south, the Ammonites were relocated to Melek about 73 BC. All the references to Jershon come from this three- to four-year period.

References

 The Book of Mormon: Another Testament of Jesus Christ, translated by Joseph Smith, Jr. (Salt Lake City, Utah: The Church of Jesus Christ of Latter-day Saints, 1981 [first edition, 1830]).

Book of Mormon places